Larga is a commune in Briceni District, Moldova. It is composed of two villages, Larga and Pavlovca.

History
On 14 January 2023, during Russian strikes against Ukraine, Moldovan border police found missile debris in Larga. Moldovan airspace was violated as a result. This is the third such event in Moldova ever since the start of the 2022 Russian invasion of Ukraine, the first being in Naslavcea on 31 October 2022 and the second being in Briceni on 5 December of the same year.

Notable people
 Mihai Cimpoi
 Serafim Urechean

References

Communes of Briceni District